Isla Air Express is a Spanish airline based in Palma de Mallorca, Spain. The airline intends to set up a network of inter-island routes using DHC-6-300 Twin Otter float planes.

Destinations
After the second expansion phase, the route network is intended to link the port areas (not airports) of the following destinations:
 Palma de Mallorca
 Menorca
 Ibiza
 Formentera
 Valencia
 Alicante

Fleet
The Isla Air Express fleet is set to consist of DeHavilland DHC-6-300 Twin Otter float planes.

References

External links
 Official website

Airlines of Spain
Airlines established in 2019
2019 establishments in the Balearic Islands
Transport in the Balearic Islands